Hebius deschauenseei, commonly known as the northern keelback or Deschauensee's keelback,  is a species of nonvenomous snake in the subfamily Natricinae of the family Colubridae. The species is endemic to Asia.

Etymology
The specific name, deschauenseei, is in honor of American ornithologist Rodolphe Meyer de Schauensee, who collected the type specimen.

Geographic range
H. deschauenseei is found in Thailand, Vietnam, and southern China (Yunnan and Guizhou).

Its type locality is in Chiang Mai province of Thailand.

Habitat

Reproduction
H. deschsuenseei is oviparous.

References

Further reading
David P, Vogel G, Nguyen TQ, Orlov NL, Pauwels OSG, Teynié A, Ziegler T (2021). "A revision of the dark-bellied, stream-dwelling snakes of the genus Hebius (Reptilia: Squamata: Natricidae) with the description of a new species from China, Vietnam and Thailand". Zootaxa 4911: 1–61.
Taylor EH (1934). "Zoological Results of the Third De Schauensee Siamese Expedition, Part III. Amphibians and Reptiles". Proceedings of the Academy of Natural Sciences of Philadelphia 86: 281–310. (Natrix deschauenseei, new species, p. 300).
Taylor EH (1965). "The Serpents of Thailand and Adjacent Waters". University of Kansas Science Bulletin 45 (9): 609–1096. (Natrix deschauenseei, pp. 825–827, Figure 52).

External links
Species of Doi Suthep Pui National Park
Flickr photo by Michael Cota

deschauenseei
Reptiles of China
Reptiles of Thailand
Reptiles of Vietnam
Reptiles described in 1934
Snakes of China
Snakes of Vietnam
Snakes of Asia
Taxa named by Edward Harrison Taylor